Breda is a city in Carroll County, Iowa, United States. The population was 500 at the 2020 census.

History
Breda got its start in the year 1877, following construction of the Maple branch of the Chicago and North Western railroad through that territory. It was named after the Dutch city of Breda by a settler native to that place.

Geography
Breda is located at  (42.182147, -94.977999).

Demographics

2010 census
As of the census of 2010, there were 483 people, 211 households, and 135 families residing in the city. The racial makeup of the city was 98.8% White, 0.4% African American, 0.2% Asian, and 0.6% from two or more races.

There were 211 households, of which 32.7% had children under the age of 18 living with them, 53.1% were married couples living together, 5.7% had a female householder with no husband present, 5.2% had a male householder with no wife present, and 36.0% were non-families. 32.2% of all households were made up of individuals, and 15.7% had someone living alone who was 65 years of age or older. The average household size was 2.29 and the average family size was 2.90.

The median age in the city was 37.6 years. 25.3% of residents were under the age of 18; 7% were between the ages of 18 and 24; 27.3% were from 25 to 44; 23.6% were from 45 to 64; and 16.8% were 65 years of age or older. The gender makeup of the city was 50.5% male and 49.5% female.

2000 census
As of the census of 2000, there were 477 people, 210 households, and 129 families residing in the city. The racial makeup of the city was 99.16% White, 0.42% African American, 0.21% Native American and 0.21% Asian. Hispanic or Latino of any race were 0.63% of the population.

There were 210 households, out of which 26.2% had children under the age of 18 living with them, 53.8% were married couples living together, 5.2% had a female householder with no husband present, and 38.1% were non-families. 35.2% of all households were made up of individuals, and 22.9% had someone living alone who was 65 years of age or older. The average household size was 2.27 and the average family size was 2.97.

In the city, the population was spread out, with 24.7% under the age of 18, 6.1% from 18 to 24, 22.9% from 25 to 44, 19.1% from 45 to 64, and 27.3% who were 65 years of age or older. The median age was 42 years. For every 100 females, there were 104.7 males. For every 100 females age 18 and over, there were 99.4 males.

The median income for a household in the city was $29,783, and the median income for a family was $41,458. Males had a median income of $26,111 versus $19,375 for females. The per capita income for the city was $17,461. About 3.6% of families and 6.9% of the population were below the poverty line, including 7.1% of those under age 18 and 10.9% of those age 65 or over.

Education 
The public school district is the Carroll Community School District, which operates schools in Carroll. The area Catholic school is the Kuemper Catholic School System, which is also in Carroll.

Previously Breda had its own Catholic schools, with the first such institution opening in 1884. St. Bernard Grade School opened in 1903, and St. Bernard High School opened in the St. Bernard building in 1927. The high school received its own building in 1951. St. Bernard High consolidated into Kuemper Catholic High in 1979. St. Bernard Elementary occupied the former high school building while the former elementary building closed that year; that building was demolished in 1980, and by 2014 two houses had been built in its place. Christ the King School formed in 1983 as a merger of St. Bernard along with Mount Carmel, Lidderdale and Maple River  Catholic schools. The Christ the King School, along with the Holy Trinity Catholic grade school, consolidated into Kuemper Catholic System in 2003.

St. Bernard Church became the owner of the former St. Bernard High/new St. Bernard Grade School/Christ the King School. The estate of Mary Nieland funded a renovation of the former cafeteria. This became the Mary Nieland Center, a community center, and as of 2014 other sections of the former school are used for other community and recreation functions.

References

External links
 City website

Cities in Carroll County, Iowa
Cities in Iowa
1877 establishments in Iowa
Populated places established in 1877